Lugovoy is a rural locality (a settlement) in Nagornoye Rural Settlement, Petushinsky District, Vladimir Oblast, Russia. The population was 162 as of 2010. There are 3 streets.

Geography 
Lugovoy is located 25 km southwest of Petushki (the district's administrative centre) by road. Pokrofskogo torfouchastka is the nearest rural locality.

References 

Rural localities in Petushinsky District